This page lists board and card games, wargames, and miniatures games published in 1971.  For video and console games, see 1971 in video gaming.

Games released or invented in 1971

See also
 1971 in video gaming

References

Games
Games by year